Padmalaya Studios is an Indian film production and distribution company established by actor Krishna and his brothers. Based in Hyderabad it mainly produces and distributes Telugu and Hindi films. The studio currently operates through its successors Indira Productions and G. Mahesh Babu Entertainment and Krishna Productions Pvt. Ltd.

Padmalaya Movies was established as a film production company by Krishna and his brothers with the film Agni Pariksha (1970). Later, Krishna was given 9.5 acres of land in 1982, by the then state government of Andhra Pradesh to foster film development in Hyderabad. The film studio complex, Padmalaya Studios, was opened in November 1984. The first film shot in the studio was Simhasanam (1986).

History

Padmalaya Movies 
Padmalaya Movies, a film production company, was established by Telugu actor Krishna and his brothers in 1970. The first film made on the banner was Agni Pariksha (1970). Later, Padmalaya produced Mosagallaku Mosagadu, first Telugu western film in 1971.

Padmalaya Studios 
Krishna was given 9.5 acres of land in Shaikpet Mandal in 1982 at a price of 8,500 per acre, by the then state government of Andhra Pradesh. Padmalaya Studios was opened in November 1984. The first film shot in the studio was Simhasanam (1986). Currently, the studio stands on about 4 acres.

Controversy 
Krishna was given 9.5 acres of land in Shaikpet Mandal in 1982 at a price of 8,500 per acre, by the then state government of Andhra Pradesh. According to sources, the market price of the land at that time was approximately 5 lakh per acre. The 9.5 acres was part of the 50-acre land that was given by the Marri Chenna Reddy government to the Telugu film industry to lure them to move base from Madras (now Chennai) to Hyderabad.

The land was given strictly for a film facility, under the Andhra Pradesh (Telangana area) alienation of state lands and land revenue rules of 1975. But the owners soon sold 5.3 acres to third parties. Currently, the studio stands on just about 4 acres.

Filmography

Telugu

Hindi

Tamil

Kannada

References

Film production companies based in Hyderabad, India
Film production companies of India
Indian film studios
1971 establishments in Andhra Pradesh
Indian companies established in 1971